Catherine Ford(e) may refer to:

Catherine Tate, née Ford, English comedian and actress
Catherine Ford, mother of Ford Grey, 1st Earl of Tankerville
Catherine Forde, see Manchester Book Award
Katherine Louise Ford, Socialist candidate in 2000 London Assembly election

See also
Kate Ford, English actress in Coronation Street
Katie Ford (disambiguation)